Nicholas Dylan Fitzgerald (born January 14, 1996) is an American football quarterback who is a free agent. He played college football for the Mississippi State Bulldogs.

High school career
Fitzgerald attended Richmond Hill High School in Richmond Hill, Georgia, where he played in a triple option system. Fitzgerald was rated as a three-star recruit by 247sports.com, and ESPN. He committed to Mississippi State on June 23, 2013.

College career

Freshman season (2015)
Fitzgerald enrolled at Mississippi State in January 2014 and sat out the 2014 season as a redshirt. In 2015, Fitzgerald served as the primary backup for Dak Prescott, appearing in eight games and throwing and running for three touchdowns each.

Fitzgerald saw his first action of the year in a 34–16 win over Southern Miss and accounted for three touchdowns in mop-up duty in a 62-13 blowout win over Northwestern State. After Prescott was sidelined with an illness, Fitzgerald played most of the game in a 45–17 win over Troy, accounting for three more touchdowns.

Sophomore season (2016)
Fitzgerald played sparingly in the Bulldogs' season opener against South Alabama, which they lost. Fitzgerald was named the starter for the Bulldogs' second game against South Carolina, this time playing the whole game and leading the Bulldogs to a 27–14 victory, running for 195 yards in the process. Against UMass, he threw for 299 yards and also ran for 110, leading the Bulldogs to a 47–35 win.  Fitzgerald had a breakout game against Samford, throwing for 417 yards and 5 touchdowns, while rushing for 119 yards and 2 touchdowns. The 5 passing touchdowns and 7 total touchdowns tied school records set by Dak Prescott, and his 536 yards of total offense were the second most in school history. The following week, Fitzgerald led the Bulldogs to an upset win over No. 4 Texas A&M, recording 391 yards of total offense and scoring 4 total touchdowns, including a 74-yard touchdown run on the Bulldogs' first offensive play.  In the Egg Bowl, the Bulldogs' annual season finale against in state rival Ole Miss, Fitzgerald led Mississippi State to a 55-20 victory and accounted for 5 total touchdowns (3 passing 2 rushing) while setting a Mississippi State single game rushing record with 258 yards.

Junior season (2017)

Nick Fitzgerald was 159 of 286 passing for 1782 yards and 15 passing touchdowns in the 2017 season. Fitzgerald had 162 carries for 984 yards and 14 rushing touchdowns. In the 2017 Egg Bowl on November, 23rd, with 9:08 remaining in the first quarter, Fitzgerald suffered an ankle injury ending his 2017 season.

Senior season (2018)

Fitzgerald started the season with 313 yards of total offense against Kansas State and 350 yards and six touchdowns against Louisiana–Lafayette.  In an October 6, 2018 game against Auburn, Fitzgerald became the all time leader in rushing yards by an SEC QB gaining 195 yards on 28 carries.  Late in the 4th quarter of a victory over Texas A&M on October 27, 2018, Fitzgerald tied Anthony Dixon for the school record with his 42nd career rushing touchdown.  He was also named the SEC player of the week for a school record sixth time.

College statistics

Professional career

Tampa Bay Buccaneers
Fitzgerald signed with the Tampa Bay Buccaneers as an undrafted free agent following the 2019 NFL Draft. On August 31, 2019, Fitzgerald was waived by the Buccaneers and was signed to the practice squad the next day. He was released on October 8, 2019.

St. Louis BattleHawks
Fitzgerald signed with the St. Louis BattleHawks of the XFL on January 18, 2020. He had his contract terminated when the league suspended operations on April 10, 2020.

TSL Sea Lions
Fitzgerald signed with the Sea Lions of The Spring League in 2021.

See also
Mississippi State Bulldogs football statistical leaders

References

External links
Mississippi State Bulldogs bio

1996 births
Living people
People from Bryan County, Georgia
Players of American football from Georgia (U.S. state)
American football quarterbacks
Mississippi State Bulldogs football players
Tampa Bay Buccaneers players
St. Louis BattleHawks players